Braun Music Center is a music education building at Stanford University in California. 

 Opened in 1984, the Braun Center serves as the link between the student residential area and the main activities center. As the main building for the Department of Music, Braun is the venue for the department's concerts and recitals and offers rehearsal studios and practice facilities as well as classrooms and offices.

Department of Music events are held in Braun's Campbell Recital Hall and Dinkelspiel Auditorium. Braun also houses the Stanford University Music Library and Recorded Sound.

References

 Joncas, Richard, 1953- Stanford University. New York : Princeton Architectural Press, 2006.

External links 
Map: 
 Stanford Music Department
 Stanford Music Library
Archive of Recorded Sound

Buildings and structures completed in 1921
Stanford University buildings and structures
Tourist attractions in Santa Clara County, California